Jacobs-Hutchinson Block, also known as Peoples' National Bank and Friendly Furniture Store, is a historic commercial building located at Fairmont, Marion County, West Virginia.  It was built in 1902, and is a five-story commercial structure with a basement and a flat roof in the Renaissance Revival style. It is a steel column and beam structure, sheathed with pressed brick, blue stone, and terra cotta.  It rests on a stone foundation.  It measures 92 feet by 80 feet deep and 84 feet high.  The building has housed department stores, a bank, a furniture store, and law offices.

It was listed on the National Register of Historic Places in 1995.

References

Commercial buildings on the National Register of Historic Places in West Virginia
Renaissance Revival architecture in West Virginia
Commercial buildings completed in 1902
Buildings and structures in Marion County, West Virginia
National Register of Historic Places in Marion County, West Virginia
Fairmont, West Virginia